The Panzer Grenadier series of board wargames is Avalanche Press's series of World War II and The Korean War tactical land combat. The first game in the series was released in 2000.

Series summary
Unlike Squad Leader and other squad-level wargames, which Panzer Grenadier is commonly compared to, Panzer Grenadier is based at the platoon level.  This makes it much more similar to the Panzer Leader and Panzer Blitz games published by Avalon Hill. The game is played on a hex grid game map. Units and other markers are made out of 2/3-inch × 2/3-inch cardboard counters.

The game also features a phased turn system where each player may alternately move and fire with some of his units on the map until all are done or the "fog of war" optional rule ends the game turn. This is in contrast to "I go, you go (IGYG)" systems where one player moves all (or the majority) of their units and then the other player moves theirs. Phased systems can create a less artificial turn structure where both players' actions are blended over the course of a single game turn.

In June 2014 the 4th edition of the ruleset was released. The overall tone of the rules was unchanged from 3rd edition, but some aspects were clarified (esp. the Line of Sight/Spotting section) and introduced armor overruns.

Boxed games
Boxed Games contain a rulebook, scenarios, counters, and one or more maps.  They are playable by themselves and do not require any additional games.

Panzer Grenadier 
Panzer Grenadier The first game to start the series, It had German and Soviet counters, 4 hard mounted maps, and was eventually replaced by the Eastern Front game.

Heroes of the Soviet Union 
Heroes of the Soviet Union Added more German and Soviet counters and two mounted maps and 24 scenarios to the original Panzer Grenadier game, which were both replaced with Eastern Front game.

Eastern Front
Eastern Front was the deluxe replacement for the Panzer Grenadier game and is set in 1941.  It is currently in a deluxe edition and features 112 scenarios. Includes German, Romanian and Russian troops and 8 maps.

Road to Berlin
Road to Berlin is set in 1945 and features 75 scenarios.

Beyond Normandy
Beyond Normandy covers British forces fighting the Waffen SS in Normandy.

Airborne Introductory Edition
Airborne Introductory Edition is a game that is intended to introduce players to the Panzer Grenadier series.  The game covers American paratroopers during the D-Day landings.

Semper Fi! Guadalcanal
Guadalcanal is the only boxed game in the Panzer Grenadier series set in the Pacific theater at this time.  It consists of Japanese forces defending the island of Guadalcanal from U.S. Marines, including Raiders and Paratroopers, in 1942.

Afrika Korps
Afrika Korps covers North Africa in 1940–1941.  It contains German, Italian, British, and Australian forces.

Desert Rats
Desert Rats is the sequel to Afrika Korps and is set in 1941–1942.  It contains British, Indian, New Zealand, German, Italian, and Italian colonial troops.

Battle of the Bulge
Battle of the Bulge covers the battle of the same name.  It has 51 scenarios and many tanks on each side.

Battle of the Bulge 2:  Elsenborn Ridge
Battle of the Bulge 2:  Elsenborn Ridge, called simply Elsenborn Ridge on Avalanche Press' website, is the first boxed Panzer Grenadier game in 2008.  It covers the northern half of the Battle of the Bulge and was designed at the same time as North Wind.

1940: The Fall of France
1940: The Fall of France covers the German invasion of France. Includes 50 scenarios and eight semi-rigid boards.

Cassino '44 
Cassino '44 covers the Allied battles around the historic abbey of Monte Cassino in Italy. Scenarios cover all 4 battles and include 2 campaign games.

Saipan 1944 
Saipan 1944 covers the American invasion of the island of Saipan in the Pacific. 40 scenarios and 4 maps with American and Japanese units cover the battle.

Korean War: Pusan Perimeter 
Pusan Perimeter covers the Initial North Korean (NKPA) surges across the 38th Parallel where South Korean (ROK) and American troops in 1950 must try to halt the advance. First in a line of Korean games in the mini-series within the Panzer Grenadier series. 48 scenarios and 4 maps.

Kursk, South Flank 
Kursk, South Flank is set in 1943 and features 50 scenarios where Germans and Soviets clash in the biggest tanks battles.

Liberation 1944 
Liberation 1944 cover the British and German battles after the Allied invasion on D-Day and features 41 scenarios.

Kursk: Burning Tigers 
Kursk: Burning Tigers covers the rest of the Kursk battles, mostly on the Northern Flank in 1943 and features 40 scenarios.

An Army At Dawn 
An Army at Dawn covers the Allied and Axis battles in Morocco, Algeria and Tunisia in 1942-1943 and features 40 scenarios.

Conquest of Ethiopia 
Conquest of Ethiopia The Italian Army and Colonial troops battle the Imperial Ethiopian Army for control of Ethiopia in 1935-1937 in 40 scenarios.

Broken Axis 
Broken Axis is set in 1944 and features 50 scenarios with Soviet, German and Romanian troops.

The Kokoda Campaign 
The Kokoda Campaign covers the battles in New Guinea for control of Port Moresby with Australians and Japanese battling it out. Adds 30 scenarios and 2 maps and is the replacement for the Kokoda Trail supplement.

Invasion 1944 
Invasion 1944 American troops fight German troops in the days following the landings in Normandy.

Korean War: Counter-Attack 
Counter-Attack picks up where Pusan Perimeter leaves off, pitting American Army, American Marines, British, South Korean (ROK) troops against the North Korean (NKPA) troops in the August–October 1950 actions before the Chinese enter the war. There are 6 maps and 65 scenarios.

Fire in the Steppe 
Fire in the Steppe is set in 1941 and features 60 scenarios with Soviet, German and Romanian troops battling for the Ukraine with 8 maps.

Road to Dunkirk 
Road to Dunkirk British Expeditionary Force against the Germans in the spring and early summer of 1940. There are 47 scenarios and 8 maps.

Book Supplements
Book Supplements are generally 64 pages of scenarios and historic background information and usually include additional counters.  Some do  include any maps and require other games to play the scenarios.

Sinister Forces
Sinister Forces adds Waffen SS and NKVD units to the series and is set on the Eastern Front.

Fronte Russo
Fronte Russo is designed by Ottavio Ricchi and Lorenzo Striuli, and covers the Italian Expeditionary Corps operations on the Eastern Front against the Soviet Union.

Jungle Fighting
Jungle Fighting is a scenario-only book for use with Guadalcanal.  It has 42 scenarios and another map printed on the back of the book.

Arctic Front
Arctic Front is a module that covers the Winter War between the Soviet Union and Finland.  Modules are not playable by themselves -- Arctic Front requires Eastern Front for most of the scenarios.

Edelweiss
Edelweiss is another module and adds German mountain troops to Panzer Grenadier.  Edelweiss also includes four 1" counters, twice the size as regular counters.  These include two German Karl mortars and two Soviet river monitors.

Black SS
Black SS is yet another module and adds late war SS troops and scenarios. 30 scenarios included and a counter sheet with 165 pieces replacing SS units from other games with new black backgrounds (instead of camo). 1940: The Fall of France, Elsenborn Ridge, Road to Berlin and Beyond Normandy are required to play all of the scenarios.

Marianas 1944 
Marianas 1944 covers the Battles of Tinian 1944, Guam 1941 and Guam 1944 and is a supplement for Saipan 1944, pitting American and Guam Insular Force Guard (GIFG) units against Japanese troops. Adds 30 scenarios, 24 counters and two maps to Saipan 1944.

White Eagles
White Eagles adds the 1939 Polish Army into the Panzer Grenadier action with 165 counters and 40 scenarios. Other games are needed to play.

Iron Curtain: Patton's Nightmare
Iron Curtain: Patton's Nightmare is a hypothetical Cold War between the American and Soviet armies in 1947 and has 77 counters and 20 scenarios. Other games are needed to play.

Hammer & Sickle
Hammer & Sickle is a hypothetical Cold War between the American and Soviet armies in 1951 and has 77 counters and 20 scenarios. Plus it includes 19 additional scenarios from the original Iron Curtain game, so 39 scenarios total. Other games are needed to play.

Iron Curtain: Red And White Poland Resists
Iron Curtain: Red And White Poland Resists is a hypothetical Cold War between the NATO Polish, American Armies against Soviet Army in 1951 and has 77 counters and 40 scenarios. Other games are needed to play.

Secret Weapons
Secret Weapons is a hypothetical extended War World II with newer weapons developed by many nations in WWII but never used in action from 1944 to 1947 and has 77 counters and 30 scenarios. Other games are needed to play.

First Axis: Slovakia At War 
First Axis: Slovakia At War covers the battles of Slovak troops from 1939-1944, adds 30 scenarios, 88 counters and requires other games to play.

Go for Broke 
Go for Broke covers the battles of Japanese-American regiment from 1943-1945, adds 30 scenarios, 77 counters and requires other games to play.

Panzer Lehr: The Panzer Lehr Division in Normandy, 1944 
Panzer Lehr: The Panzer Lehr Division in Normandy, 1944 covers the battles of Panzer Lehr Division in Normandy 1944, adds 27 scenarios, 102 counters but requires other games to play.

Kokoda Trail 
Kokoda Trail covers the battles in New Guinea for control of Port Moresby with Australians and Japanese battling it out. Adds 30 scenarios and 2 maps but requires other games to play.

Workers and Peasants The Red Army at War 
Worker and Peasants the Red Army at War Focuses on the Germans initial battles in Russian in 1941. Adds 25 scenarios and 165 counters but requires other games to play.

Winter Soldiers 
Winter Soldiers More Battle of the Bulge scenarios, kind of bridges the missing scenarios from the two Bulge games; Battle of the Bulge and Elsenborn Ridge. Adds 30 scenarios but requires other games to play.

Tank Battles 
Tank Battles Now out of print but covers mostly Eastern Front battles and a few other unique battles. Adds 46 scenarios but requires other games to play.

Invasion Of Germany 
Invasion Of Germany covers Western Front battles of 1944. Adds 48 scenarios but requires other games to play.

River Fleets 
River Fleets It is a spiral bond book but add both counters and maps, so I listed in this section. Adds Serbian, Romanian and Austro-Hungarian counters two maps and 10 scenarios to the series. Lot of new river fighting ships/boats as well!

Spearhead Division 
Spearhead Division Third Armored Division fought its way from Normandy deep into Germany. Adds 25 scenarios, 88 counters American counters but requires Elsenborn Ridge to play.

Leyte 1944 
Leyte 1944 The Battles to retake Leyte in hard fought battles which include Japanese paratroopers. Adds 46 scenarios, adds 88 counters but requires Saipan 1944 and Marianas 1944 to play.

Spiral-Bound supplements

Iron Curtain
Iron Curtain is a fictional supplement covering a war between the United States and the Soviet Union in 1945 and 1946.

South Africa's War
South Africa's War covers the operations of South Africa's military between 1940 and 1942 in Somaliland, Ethiopia, Egypt and Libya. Adds 20 scenarios and 88 counters but requires other games to play.

Blue Division
Blue Division covers the Spanish "Blue Division" on the Eastern Front. Adds 88 counters and 20 scenarios.

Red Warriors
Red Warriors adds Soviet Guards forces to Panzer Grenadier.  The now out-of-print Heroes of the Soviet Union supplement contained the counters and half of the scenarios, all of which have been rewritten for this supplement.

Nihon Silk
Nihon Silk adds Japanese paratroopers from different engagements from 1942-45 in 10 scenarios with 165 counters. This supplement requires other games to play.

Power Of The East
Power Of The East Shows the conflict over Manchuria between Japanese and Soviet troops from 1938-39. Adds 12 scenarios with 165 counters. This supplement requires other games to play.

Waltzing Matilda The Defense of Australia, 1942
Waltzing Matilda The Defense of Australia, 1942 covers hypothetical battles of Japan invading Australia in 1942. Adds 12 scenarios with 330 counters. This supplement requires other games to play.

Divisione Corazzata
Divisione Corazzata covers hypothetical battles with Italian Army having better tanks. Adds 10 scenarios with 88 counters from the Gold Club. This supplement requires other games to play.

Indian Unity
Indian Unity covers actual battles between India and Hyderabad in 1948. Adds 10 scenarios with 165 counters. This supplement requires other games to play.

Hopeless But Not Serious
Hopeless But Not Serious The Austrian Federal Army 1934-1938, covers actual and theoretical battles between Austrians and Nazis. Adds 16 scenarios with 330 counters. This supplement requires other games to play.

Iron Wolves Lithuania's Army
Iron Wolves Lithuania's Army covers the Lithuania's Army in 1939–1941. Adds 10 scenarios with 165 counters. This supplement requires other games to play.

DAK '44
DAK '44 covers hypothetical battles of Combat In North Africa, 1944. Adds 10 scenarios with 165 counters. This supplement requires other games to play.

Iron Curtain: Maple Leaf Brigade 
Map Leaf Brigade covers and adds the Canadians troops to the early Cold-War series within the Panzer Grenadier series. Adds 88 counters, 10 scenarios but this supplement requires ownership of other games.

Golden Journal: Summer 2013 
Summer 2013 Part of the Avalanche Press Gold-Club series, The Fall of Luxembourg, adds 20 Luxembourg counters and a couple of scenarios.

Gold Club counters: Division Marocain 
Division Marocain 2014 Adds 176 Moroccan counters to the Fall of France game and a few scenarios.

Golden Journal: Equinox 2015 
Equinox 2015 Part of the Avalanche Press Gold-Club series, adds late model Japanese Armor counters for what if scenarios and corrected Marine counters for the earlier release of Saipan 1944.

Golden Journal: Aphelion 2015 
Aphelion 2015 Part of the Avalanche Press Gold-Club series, adds East-German Cold-War counters to the Cold-War series and a few scenarios.

Golden Journal: Columbus Day 2015 
Columbus Day 2015 Part of the Avalanche Press Gold-Club series, Called The last Horse Soldier and adds what if American Mounted Cavalry counters to the Army at Dawn game and a couple of scenarios.

Golden Journal: St. Patrick's Day 2016 
St. Patrick's Day 2016 Part of the Avalanche Press Gold-Club series, adds Irish Republican Army counters for a few what if scenarios.

Golden Journal: Groundhog Day 2016 
Groundhog Day 2016 Part of the Avalanche Press Gold-Club series, adds German Armor counters that could have been produced and used in the Battle of Kursk and a few scenarios.

Scenario booklets (no counters)
Scenario booklets are add-ons with 10 scenarios.  They do not have any counters or maps, therefore requiring the ownership of other games.  Avalanche Press intends to release a scenario booklet every month that does not have another Panzer Grenadier game launching.

North Wind
North Wind, released in August 2007, is the first of the scenario-only booklets and covers the German Operation Nordwind.

Alaska's War
Alaska's War covers the Japanese invasion of the Aleutian Islands and the American missions to recapture them.

March on Leningrad
March on Leningrad, announced on March 24, 2008, is a new scenario booklet covering the German offensive towards Leningrad in the summer of 1941.

Siege of Leningrad
Siege of Leningrad, announced along with March to Leningrad on March 24, 2008, is based on the later part of the siege of Leningrad and the Red Army's attacks in 1943 and 1944.

Army Group South Ukraine: Battles in Bessarabia, 1944
Army Group South Ukraine focuses on defensive battles of the Grossdeutschland Division Infantry Regiment Großdeutschland in Bessarabia, Romania.

Panzer Lion: Grossdeutschland in Action, 1944
Panzer Lion has more scenarios for Grossdeutschland Infantry Regiment Großdeutschland.

Little Saturn
Little Saturn Death of the Armata Italiana in Russia. Adds 10 scenarios but requires other games to play.

Carpathian Brigade
Carpathian Brigade Desert battles of the Polish Exiles. Adds 11 scenarios but requires other games to play.

References

External links
 Avalanche Press' Panzer Grenadier page
 Panzer Grenadier Headquarters - an exhaustive fansite dedicated to the series

Avalanche Press games
World War II board wargames